Novelo is a surname. Notable people with the surname include:

Cleominio Zoreda Novelo (born 1950), Mexican politician and lawyer 
Claudia Novelo (born 1965), Mexican synchronized swimmer
Freddy Novelo (1960-2013), Mexican philanthropist and art collector
Landy Berzunza Novelo (born 1965), Mexican politician
Lupita Novelo (born 1967), Mexican tennis player